Hutak or Hutk may refer to:
 Hutak, Kerman
 Hutak, Ekhtiarabad, Kerman Province
 Hutak, Sistan and Baluchestan